Nupaky is a municipality and village in Prague-East District in the Central Bohemian Region of the Czech Republic. It has about 1,900 inhabitants. It lies on the junction of D0 and D1 motorways.

Economy
Nupaky is known for its industrial zone, which benefits from the proximity of Prague and the motorways.

References

Villages in Prague-East District